Haworth, Cross Roads and Stanbury is a civil parish covering the far western hinterland of the City of Bradford in West Yorkshire, England. According to the 2001 census the parish had a population of 6,566, increasing to 6,994 at the 2011 Census. As its name suggests, it covers Haworth, Cross Roads and Stanbury, with a large moorland area to the west of Stanbury.

References

External links

Map of the area

Civil parishes in West Yorkshire
Geography of the City of Bradford